

G
 GA   - Georgia Railroad, Seaboard System Railroad, CSX Transportation
 GAAB - South Carolina Central Railroad (Georgia and Alabama Division)
 GABX - General American Marks Company
 GACX - General American Marks Company, GATX Corporation
 GAEX - General American Marks Company
 GAFX - Fuller Company
 GALX - Georgia Power Company
 GAMX - General American de Mexico, Arrendadora Nacional De Carros De Ferrocaril
 GANO - Georgia Northern Railway
 GAOX - General American Transportation Corporation
 GAPX - Georgia-Pacific Corporation (Plaquemine Division), Georgia Gulf Corporation
 GARX - General American Transportation Corporation, GATX de Mexico, SA de CV
 GASC - Georgia, Ashburn, Sylvester & Camilla Railroad
 GASX - General American Marks Company
 GATU - Gateway Container Leasing
 GATX - General American Marks Company, GATX Corporation
 GAUX - General American Transportation Corporation
 GAYX - General American Transportation Corporation
 GBRX - Greenbrier Leasing Corporation
 GBRY - Gettysburg Railway
 GBRZ - Greenbrier Leasing Corporation
 GBW  - Green Bay and Western Railroad; Fox Valley and Western Railroad; Wisconsin Central Railway; Canadian National Railway
 GBWX - Gerber Products Company; Sandoz; Novartis
 GC   - Georgia Central Railway
 GCAU - GCA Transport
 GCCX - General American Marks Company
 GCDU - Overseas Container
 GCEU - Genstar Container Corporation
 GCEZ - Genstar Container Corporation
 GCFX - Alstom Canada Transport
 GCGX - Gulf Coast Grain
 GCIX - Gabriel Chemicals
 GCLX - Gold Coast Limited
 GCLZ - Global Chassis Leasing
 GCMX - National Railway Historical Society (Gold Coast Chapter)
 GCOX - Gold Coast Railroad Museum
 GCPU - Genstar (Burlington Northern and Santa Fe Railway; BNSF Railway)
 GCPX - Georgia Gulf Corporation (PVC Division)
 GCRX - Grand Canyon Railway
 GCSF - Gulf, Colorado and Santa Fe Railway
 GCSR - Gulf, Colorado and San Saba Railway
 GCSU - G.C.S. Containers Service, SA
 GCTU - Gulf Container Lines
 GCTX - General Chemical Corporation
 GCW  - Garden City Western Railway
 GCX  - Alltank Equipment Corporation, Honeywell
 GDCX - General American Marks Company
 GDJX - Grimmel Industries
 GDLK - Grand Elk Railroad
 GEAX - Trinity Rail Management
 GECX - GE Transportation
 GECZ - GE Capital Container Finance Corporation
 GEGX - GE Gas Turbine
 GELX - Garvey Elevators, Grain Marketing
 GEMX - GE Rail Services
 GENX - GE Rail Services
 GEOX - GEO Specialty Chemicals
 GEPX - Trinity Rail Management
 GETX - Getty Refining and Marketing Company, General American Marks Company
 GETY - Gettysburg Railroad (1976-1996)
 GETZ - Transport International Pool
 GEX  - General Electric Company
 GEXR - Goderich-Exeter Railway (RailAmerica)
 GF   - Central of Georgia Railroad, Norfolk Southern
 GFAX - Gordon Fay Associates
 GFC  - Grand Falls Central Railway
 GFCX - Glens Falls Lehigh Cement Company
 GFCZ - General Foods Corporation
 GFHX - Commercial Credit Capital Corporation
 GFJX - Garret Railroad Car & Equipment
 GFLX - Greenfield Logistics
 GFR  - Grand Forks Railway
 GFRR - Georgia & Florida Railroad
 GFSX - General American Marks Company
 GGCX - Georgia Gulf Corporation (Plaquemine Division)
 GGIX - Garvey International (Garvey Grain Division)
 GGMX - Golden Gate Railroad Museum
 GGPX - General American Marks Company
 GGS  - South Carolina Central Railroad (Georgia Great Southern Division)
 GHBX - G. Heileman Brewing Company
 GHH  - Galveston, Houston and Henderson Railroad
 GHRD - Green Hills Rural Development (Chillicothe-Brunswick Rail Maintenance Authority)
 GHRX - GHR Energy Corporation
 GIEX - General American Marks Company
 GIHX - Gifford-Hill & Company (Cornerstone C & M Incorporated); Hanson
 GILX - Gilman Paper Company
 GIMX - General American Marks Company
 GITM - Golden Isles Terminal Railroad
 GJ   - Greenwich and Johnsonville Railway
 GJR  - Guelph Junction Railway
 GKLX - Gold Kist
 GLBZ - Trac Lease
 GLC  - Great Lakes Central Railroad
 GLCU - Flex-Van Leasing
 GLCX - Great Lakes Carbon
 GLKU - Great Lakes Chemical Corporation
 GLKX - Great Lakes Chemical Corporation
 GLLX - Great Lakes Locomotive Leasing
 GLNX - GLNX Corporation
 GLRX - Georgetown Loop Railroad
 GLSR - Gloster Southern Railroad
 GLSX - Glacier State Distribution Services
 GMCX - General Motors Corporation
 GMDX - General Motors Diesel Canada
 GMGX - M and G Polymers USA
 GMHX - General American Marks Company
 GMTX - General American Marks Company
 GMIX - Chicago Freight Car Leasing Company
 GMO  - Gulf, Mobile and Ohio Railroad, Illinois Central Gulf Railroad, Illinois Central, Canadian National Railway
 GMRC - Green Mountain Railroad
 GMRY - Great Miami and Scioto Railway
 GMSR - Kansas City Southern Railway
 GN   - Great Northern Railway, Burlington Northern Railroad, Burlington Northern and Santa Fe Railway; BNSF Railway
 GNA  - Graysonia, Nashville and Ashdown Railroad, Kansas City Southern Railway
 GNAX - Holnam
 GNBC - Grainbelt Corporation, Farmrail
 GNCU - Gallatin National Company
 GNFX - Gainesville, Florida (City of)
 GNLX - Georgia Industrial Leasing Company
 GNRR - Georgia Northeastern Railroad
 GNTX - Railgon Company, TTX Corporation
 GNWR - Genesee and Wyoming Railroad
 GOCU - Greenfield Overseas Container
 GOCX - Gulf Oil Products Company, Chevron Phillips Chemical Company
 GOHX - General American Marks Company
 GONX - Railgon Company, TTX Corporation
 GOT  - Greater Toronto Transit Authority
 GOTU - Gulf Overseas Towing
 GPBX - Georgia-Pacific Corporation
 GPCX - General Electric Company (General Purpose Control Department), Georgia-Pacific Corporation
 GPDX - General American Marks Company
 GPEX - General American Transportation Corporation
 GPFX - General American Marks Company, GATX Corporation
 GPIX - General Portland, Sunbelt Cement
 GPLU - Management Control and Maintenance
 GPLX - General American Marks Company
 GPMX - Georgia-Pacific Corporation (Mid Continent Wood Products Manufacturing Division)
 GPPX - Georgia-Pacific Corporation (Portland Division)
 GPSX - Georgia-Pacific Corporation (Eastern Wood Products Manufacturing Division)
 GPUX - GPU Service Corporation
 GR   - Grand Rapids Eastern Railroad
 GRCX - Granite Rock Company (Graniterock)
 GRDX - Grand River Dam Authority
 GREX - Georgetown Rail Equipment Company
 GRFF - Georgia and Florida Railroad
 GRIV - Gauley River Railroad
 GRLW - Greenville & Western Railway Company (Western Carolina Railway Service Corporation)
 GRMX - Gopher State Railway Museum
 GRN  - Greenville and Northern Railway (retired mark, line now abandoned)
 GRNR - Grand River Railway
 GRNW - Great Northwest Railroad
 GROI - Genesee Rail-One
 GROX - Growth Nonstop Cooperative, First Union Rail
 GRPX - General Chemical, CIT Financial
 GRR  - Georgetown Railroad
 GRRX - Wampum Hardware
 GRRY - Grand River Railway
 GRSX - Gunderson Rail Services
 GRTX - Savage-Tolk Energy Services
 GRWR - Great Walton Railroad
 GRYR - Grenada Railway
 GRYX - John H. Grace Company, Transmatrix
 GSAX - Granite State Concrete Company
 GSCU - Eurotainer US
 GSCX - Greenville Leasing Company, General American Marks Company
 GSF  - Georgia Southern and Florida Railway
 GSI  - Gulf and Ship Island Railroad
 GSIX - Gas Supply, Williams Energy Ventures
 GSLX - George R Silcott Railway Equipment
 GSM  - Great Smoky Mountains Railroad
 GSNX - Gulf States Utilities Company, Helm Financial Corporation
 GSOR - Indiana Hi-Rail Corporation
 GSPX - Great Southern Plywood Company
 GSRX - Golden Spike Railroad Services
 GSSX - Gopher State Scrap and Metal
 GSTU - Genstar Container Corporation
 GSW  - Great Southwest Railroad
 GSWR - South Carolina Central Railroad (Georgia Southwestern Division)
 GSWX - G and S Company
 GT   - Grand Trunk Railway
 GTA  - Grand Trunk Western, Canadian National Railway
 GTAX - Harvest States Cooperative
 GTC  - Gulf Transport
 GTEU - General Transport Equipment Company
 GTER - Grafton Terminal Railroad
 GTIS - Guilford Transportation Industries
 GTIZ - G. T. Intermodal USA
 GTLZ - G. T. Leasing
 GTP - Grand Trunk Pacific Railway (expired)
 GTPR - Grand Trunk Pacific Railway
 GTPZ - TIT Services
 GTR  - Great River Railroad (Rosedale-Bolivar County Port Commission)
 GTRA - Golden Triangle Railroad
 GTTX - Trailer Train Company, TTX Company
 GTW  - Grand Trunk Western, Canadian National Railway
 GTWQ - Grand Trunk Western, Canadian National Railway
 GTZZ - GT Trucking
 GU   - Grafton and Upton Railroad
 GUAX - Georgia Power Company
 GUEX - General American Marks Company
 GURZ - Grafton and Upton Railroad
 GVCX - Glen-Valley Corporation
 GVDX - Oxy Vinyls
 GVSR - Galveston Railroad
 GWAX - Railroad Salvage and Restoration
 GWCX - Greenway Centre
 GWER - Gateway Eastern Railway; Kansas City Southern Railway
 GWF  - Galveston Wharves
 GWHX - Stevens Energy
 GWIX - GWI Leasing Corporation
 GWR  - Great Western Railway of Colorado
 GWRC - Georgia Woodlands Railroad
 GWRS - Great Western Railway (Saskatchewan)
 GWSR - Great Western Railway (Saskatchewan)
 GWSW - GWI Switching Services, LP
 GWWD - Greater Winnipeg Water District
 GWWE - Gateway Eastern Railway
 GWAG - Greenwood And Grizzly RailRoad 
 GWWR - Gateway Western Railway
 GYLX - Gaylord Container Corporation

G